Pierre Émile Flamion (13 December 1924 – 3 January 2004) was a French football manager and former player who played striker.

Honours

As a player
Reims
Division 1: 1948–49 
Coupe de France: 1949–50

Orders
Chevalier of the Ordre national du Mérite: 1998

References

External links
 Profile
 weltfussball

1924 births
2004 deaths
Sportspeople from Morbihan
Footballers from Brittany
French footballers
France international footballers
Association football forwards
Ligue 1 players
Stade de Reims players
Olympique de Marseille players
Olympique Lyonnais players
AS Troyes-Savinienne players
Limoges FC players
French football managers
Limoges FC managers
FC Metz managers
AS Troyes-Savinienne managers
Stade de Reims managers
Thionville FC managers
Knights of the Ordre national du Mérite